Timon Dobias (born 28 July 1989) is a retired Slovak football player.

Club career
Dobias is a product of 1. FC Košice, later renamed to MFK, youth squads. He made his Corgoň Liga debut two days before his 19th birthday in a 1–0 away win against Dukla Banská Bystrica. He scored his first goal in a 1–0 home win against DAC Dunajská Streda on 5 March 2011.

On 31 July 2019 it was announced, that Dobias had decided to retire due to chronic health problems, spending most of his career in clubs from Košice Region.

Career statistics

References

External links
MFK Košice profile

1989 births
Living people
Sportspeople from Košice
Association football midfielders
Slovak footballers
Slovakia youth international footballers
Slovakia under-21 international footballers
FK Košice – Krásna players
FC VSS Košice players
FC Košice (2018) players
Slovak Super Liga players
2. Liga (Slovakia) players
3. Liga (Slovakia) players
4. Liga (Slovakia) players
5. Liga players